Razaviyeh District is a district (bakhsh) in Mashhad County, Razavi Khorasan province, Iran. At the 2006 census, its population was 67,093, in 15,527 families.  The district has one city: Razaviyeh. The district has three rural districts (dehestan): Abravan Rural District, Meyami Rural District, and Pain Velayat Rural District.

References 

Districts of Razavi Khorasan Province
Mashhad County